Niemann Foods, Inc. (NFI) is a company headquartered in Quincy, Illinois, United States, that owns and operates over 100 supermarkets, pharmacies, convenience, pet and hardware stores mostly under the County Market, County Market Express, Harvest Market, Cenex One-Stop, Haymakers, ACE Hardware, Pet Supplies Plus, and Save-A-Lot banners in Illinois, Indiana, Iowa, and Missouri. The regional grocery store operator is growing and expanding market share in the Central Illinois, Indiana and Missouri. The employee-owned, family-run company was founded in 1917 by brothers Ferd and Steve Niemann and is currently headed by Rich Niemann, Jr.

History 
It was 1917 when Ferd Niemann, Sr. and Steve Niemann opened their first grocery store. By 1930, they were operating 10 corner grocery stores and a wholesale business. In 1940 Niemann Foods, Inc. introduced the first full-service supermarket to Quincy, Illinois.

Niemann Foods' Save-A-Lot stores offer a limited assortment of groceries at discount prices while County Market stores are conventional grocery stores. NFI opened its first Harvest Market grocery store in Champaign, Illinois, in October 2016. This new concept store is not only a grocery store with a deli, bakery and coffee shop, but also features a restaurant, bar and educational cooking area. The first ValuCheck grocery store opened in Pekin in May 2016 and is a cost-plus format. NFI opened its second ValuCheck store in Champaign in December 2016.

Supermarket affiliates 

 County Market 
County Market Health Mart (Pharmacy) 
 Save A Lot
 ACE Hardware
 Pet Supplies Plus
 County Market Express (gas stations) 
 Harvest Market (premium grocery store)
 Haymakers (gas stations)
 ValuCheck (Grocery)

See also 
 SuperValu, Inc.

References

Supermarkets of the United States
American companies established in 1917
Retail companies established in 1917
1917 establishments in Illinois
Companies based in Adams County, Illinois